Ciprian Dinu (born 27 May 1982) is a Romanian footballer who plays for Liga IV club Flacăra Horezu.

Career
Dinu began playing football for Unirea Focșani in Liga II. He joined CS Jiul Petroșani in July 2005 and made 47 Liga I appearances for the club.

He was named captain at Jiul Petroșani, but left the club on a free transfer after playing one season in Liga II. The 26-year-old joined Liga II side CSM Râmnicu Vâlcea on a two-year contract. Dinu played one season with Râmnicu Vâlcea, becoming the team captain, but the club could not afford his wages and terminated his contract in July 2009.

In 2011, he joined FC Botoșani.

References

External links
 

1982 births
Living people
Sportspeople from Focșani
Romanian footballers
Association football defenders
Liga I players
Liga II players
CSM Jiul Petroșani players
SCM Râmnicu Vâlcea players
AFC Săgeata Năvodari players
FC Botoșani players